"Girlfriend" is a song by English rock band Wings, from their 1978 album London Town. It was written by Wings frontman Paul McCartney, who originally intended it to be sung by Michael Jackson. Jackson then covered the song the following year on his 1979 album Off the Wall, and in 1980 it was released (in the UK only) as the 5th and final single of that album.

Background
McCartney thought of "Girlfriend" as a song that Michael Jackson might like to record, and mentioned this to Jackson at a party in Hollywood. Jackson had stated in interviews with the music press in the 1970s that he was a fan of the Beatles and the chance to record a McCartney original helped to inspire his next project. However, McCartney ended up recording it himself with his band Wings, and it was issued in 1978 on the album London Town. Michael always said that he wrote the song for a platonic love "Paul and me... well... we wrote this song for my crush, she is a gorgeous singer, foreign and it is even better, you know?, because she has no idea of my feelings, and you don't know how I long to do what I say... I will never say her name, would be a crime"...

Kingsport Times-News critic Michael Clark regarded the song as the better of the two Bee Gees' sendups on London Town, "With a Little Luck" being the other.  He also regarded it as one of the two best songs on the album, along with "I've Had Enough," praising the "light, bouncy melody" and the falsetto singing added to the "sweet backing harmonies" whenever the word "girlfriend" is sung. On the other hand, Hartford Courant critic Henry McNulty regarded it as one of the Wings' weakest songs since "Wild Life", criticising its harmonies and lyrics, and finding only the "mildly exciting guitar line" to be worthy of even faint praise.

Quincy Jones heard the song and suggested it as a possible track for Jackson to record for his 1979 album Off the Wall, not aware that the song had been written for Jackson in the first place. Jackson's recording omitted the middle eight heard in McCartney's version. It was issued exclusively in the UK in 1980, as the fifth and final single from the Off the Wall album. This proved to be another hit single for Jackson and one of his first recordings of a Paul McCartney song.

McCartney and Jackson subsequently worked together on "The Girl Is Mine" from Jackson's Thriller, as well as "Say Say Say" and "The Man", from McCartney's Pipes of Peace. In 1985, Jackson acquired the ATV Music Publishing catalog (which held the rights to nearly every Beatles song) uncontested by McCartney. According to McCartney, they "drifted apart" after he talked to Jackson about getting a "raise" and Jackson did not act on it.

Personnel

Paul McCartney – vocals, bass, acoustic and electric guitars, drums, electric piano, synthesizers, possible piano
Linda McCartney – keyboards, backing vocals
Denny Laine – acoustic and electric guitars, backing vocals, possible piano

Michael Jackson version
Cash Box said that Jackson's version was "rendered brilliantly."

Produced by Quincy Jones
Recorded and Mixed by Bruce Swedien
Lead and background vocals: Michael Jackson
Bass: Louis Johnson
Drums: John Robinson
Electric piano: Greg Phillinganes
Synthesizer: David Foster, George Duke
Synthesizer programming: Steve Porcaro and George Duke
Guitar: Wah Wah Watson and Marlo Henderson
Horns arranged by Jerry Hey and performed by The Seawind Horns:
Trumpet and flugelhorn: Jerry Hey
Tenor, alto saxophones and flute: Larry Williams
Baritone, tenor saxophones and flute: Kim Hutchcroft
Trombone: William Reichenbach
Trumpet: Gary Grant
Alto sax solo: Larry Williams
Rhythm arrangement by Quincy Jones, Tom Bahler and Greg Phillinganes
Vocal arrangement by Michael Jackson and Quincy Jones

References

External links
Lyrics from Paul McCartney's official site

1978 songs
1980 singles
Michael Jackson songs
Paul McCartney songs
Paul McCartney and Wings songs
Songs written by Paul McCartney
Pop ballads
Rhythm and blues ballads
Song recordings produced by Quincy Jones
Epic Records singles
Song recordings produced by Paul McCartney
Music published by MPL Music Publishing
1970s ballads